"Christmas in L.A." is a song by Las Vegas-based rock band The Killers featuring Dawes, released on December 1, 2013. The song marks the eighth consecutive year in which the band has released a Christmas song. As with their seven previous releases, all proceeds from this song goes to AIDS charities as part of the Product Red campaign. The song was written by Brandon Flowers and Mark Stoermer of The Killers and Taylor Goldsmith from Dawes. Irving Berlin also has a writing credit due to the song featuring lyrics from "White Christmas".

Music video
The music video for the song was unveiled on December 1, 2013.  The video features actor Owen Wilson portraying a struggling actor in Los Angeles at Christmastime.  Actor Harry Dean Stanton also appears as a voice of reason.

The music video was directed by Kelly Loosli and filmed and animated by students and alumni from Brigham Young University. The video was produced by Kelly Loosli, Thomas Lefler, Kyle Stapley, and Cassie Hiatt.  Jordan Hunter, a student at BYU, edited the video.

Track listing
Digital Download
 "Christmas in L.A." – 4:27

Charts

References

The Killers songs
American Christmas songs
2013 singles
2013 songs
2010s ballads
Christmas charity singles
Male vocal duets
Songs written by Brandon Flowers
Songs written by Dave Keuning
Songs written by Ronnie Vannucci Jr.
Songs written by Mark Stoermer
Song recordings produced by Steve Lillywhite
Island Records singles
Rock ballads
Songs about Los Angeles
Songs written by Irving Berlin